Bulbine bruynsii is a species of plant in the genus Bulbine. It is endemic to South Africa.

Distribution and habitat
It occurs in the vicinity of the Knersvlakte in the arid Namaqualand region, in the area between the Western Cape and Northern Cape Provinces, South Africa. Roughly twelve populations are known. Its natural habitat is open saline patches of quartz and clay flats, in "Hardeveld" vegetation.

Description
Each head normally only forms two leaves, which are wrinkled and rugose. It is deciduous and is only visible above ground in the rainy season from June until September. For the rest of the year it is dormant and below the ground.

References
 Loots, S. & Craven, P. 2004. Bulbine bruynsii. 2006 IUCN Red List of Threatened Species. 
 Helme, N.A. & von Staden, L. 2012. Bulbine bruynsii S.A.Hammer. National Assessment: Red List of South African Plants version 2013.1. Accessed on 2014/05/19Helme, N. 2013.

Flora of South Africa
bruynsii
Plants described in 1998